Webbs is an unincorporated community in Green County, Kentucky, United States.

References

Unincorporated communities in Green County, Kentucky
Unincorporated communities in Kentucky